Top Dance/Electronic Albums, Dance/Electronic Albums (formerly Top Electronic Albums) is a music chart published weekly by Billboard magazine which ranks the top-selling electronic music albums in the United States based on sales compiled by Nielsen SoundScan. The chart debuted on the issue dated June 30, 2001 under the title Top Electronic Albums, with the first number-one title being the original soundtrack to the film Lara Croft: Tomb Raider. It originally began as a fifteen-position chart and has since expanded to twenty-five positions.

Top Electronic Albums features full-length albums by artists who are associated with electronic music genres (house, techno, IDM, trance, etc.) as well as pop-oriented dance music and electronic-leaning hip hop. Also eligible for this chart are remix albums by otherwise non-electronic-based artists and DJ-mixed compilation albums and film soundtracks which feature a majority of electronic or dance music.

In 2019, Billboard added a companion chart, Dance/Electronic Album Sales, which tracks the top 15 albums based solely on physical sales, but with an emphasis on core dance/electronic artists.

The Fame by Lady Gaga holds the record for the most weeks at number one (175 weeks) as well as the most weeks on the chart (469 weeks). As of the issue dated March 18, 2023, Renaissance by Beyoncé is the current number one.

Artist milestones

Most number-one albums

Most cumulative weeks at number one

Most entries on the chart

Album milestones

Most weeks at number one

Most weeks on the chart

Year-end number-one albums
List of albums that ranked number-one on the Billboard Top Dance/Electronic Albums Year-End chart.
2001: Pulse – Various Artists
2002: 18 – Moby
2003: N.Y.C. Underground Party 5 – Louie DeVito
2004: Fired Up! – Various Artists
2005: Demon Days – Gorillaz
2006: Confessions on a Dance Floor – Madonna
2007: St. Elsewhere – Gnarls Barkley
2008: Kala – M.I.A.
2009: The Fame – Lady Gaga
2010: The Fame – Lady Gaga
2011: Born This Way – Lady Gaga
2012: Sorry for Party Rocking – LMFAO
2013: Random Access Memories – Daft Punk
2014: Artpop – Lady Gaga
2015: Listen – David Guetta
2016: Now That's What I Call a Workout 2016 – Various Artists
2017: Memories...Do Not Open – The Chainsmokers
2018: Memories...Do Not Open – The Chainsmokers
2019: Marshmello Fortnite Extended Set – Marshmello
2020: Chromatica – Lady Gaga
2021: The Fame – Lady Gaga
2022: Honestly, Nevermind – Drake

See also
 List of Billboard number-one electronic albums

References

External links
 Current Dance/Electronic Albums

Billboard charts